Shaaray Tphiloh is a Jewish congregation in Portland, Maine. It is "Portland, Maine’s oldest continuously operating synagogue".

History
The congregation's first building, a large, neo-Classical building, was constructed between 1901 and 1905 at 145 Newbury Street in the  Old Port neighborhood of Portland. 

In the 1950s, as the Jewish community moved to the "suburbs" of Portland the congregation moved to Noyes Street, not far from Woodford's Corner. In 2015, it moved into the building of the neighboring Conservative synagogue, Temple Beth El. The two congregations coexist in separate prayer spaces, and join each other for social and other community events. 

In addition to serving the local Jewish community, the congregation welcomes many Jewish travelers who visit Maine for vacations. 

Historian Michael Cohen wrote of the congregation's history in the journal Maine History. His article "Adapting Orthodoxy to American Life: Shaarey Tphiloh and the development of Modern Orthodox Judaism in Portland, Maine, 1904–1976" describes the changes that took place within the congregation as its congregation acculturated over the decades since its founding.

References

External links
 Maine Synagogue

Synagogues in Maine
Religious buildings and structures in Portland, Maine
Jewish organizations established in 1901
Jews and Judaism in Portland, Maine
1901 establishments in Maine